A song loan (or song lang or song lan) is a percussion instrument (idiophone) used in Vietnamese traditional music.

Construction
The song loan consists of a hollow wooden body about 7 cm in diameter attached to a flexible curved metal piece ended  with a wooden ball.

Playing
It is put on the ground and can be played by using the foot to force the ball to beat the body of the instrument.

Performance 
The song loan is mostly used to keep the beat in Vietnamese traditional chamber music such as ca Huế), and theatrical music such as nhạc tài tử and cải lương.

See also
 Castanets

References

Vietnamese musical instruments
Asian percussion instruments
Idiophones